Mandt may refer to:

Mandt (surname)
Mandt Township, Chippewa County, Minnesota, a township in Chippewa County, Minnesota, United States

See also
Mandt Bros. Productions, an American production company